Jas Imam Pesna is the debut album by Macedonian pop musician, Karolina. The album was released  in Macedonia and Serbia & Montenegro.

Track listings
"Sakaj Me"
"Bez Ogled Na Se"
"Milenium So Tebe"
"Tajna"
"Zasekogaš"
"Za Nas"
"Jas Imam Pesna"
"Srcevo Ne Ќe Izdrži"
"Nemir" (featuring Toše Proeski)

Release history

Chart positions

Awards
Golden Lady Bug
 The Best Female Singer Of The Year
 Album Of The Year
 Music Video Of The Year for "Bez Ogled Na Se"

Karolina Gočeva albums
2000 albums